Alejandro Esteban "Topo" Rodríguez (born 27 December 1965) is an Argentine politician, currently serving as National Deputy representing Buenos Aires Province. A member of the Justicialist Party, Rodríguez was elected in 2019 for the Federal Consensus coalition. He previously served as Minister of Agrarian Affairs of Buenos Aires Province in the administration of Governor Daniel Scioli.

Early life and education
Rodríguez was born on 27 December 1965 in Tandil. He studied political science at the Universidad del Salvador, graduating in 1990, and counts with a master's degree on Administration and Public Policy from the University of Chile. Rodríguez is married and has one daughter, born in 2002.

Rodríguez has taught at the University of Buenos Aires, the National University of La Plata, the Pontifical Catholic University of Argentina, and the Favaloro University.

Political career
Rodríguez was appointed Undersecretary of Government of Buenos Aires Province in 2009. In 2011, he was appointed Undersecretary of Governmental Coordination at the Cabinet Chief's Office of the Province, a position he held until 2013. On 26 December 2013, he was appointed Minister of Agrarian Affairs of the province, succeeding Gustavo Arrieta. As minister, Rodríguez decreed the mandatory vaccination of cattle against anthrax. During the latter part of his administration, Rodríguez was critical of the agrarian policies of Axel Kicillof, then Economy Minister of Argentina.

Following the election of María Eugenia Vidal as Governor of Buenos Aires in 2015, Rodríguez became Cabinet Chief of La Matanza Partido, under intendenta Verónica Magario.

National Deputy
Rodríguez ran for a seat in the Argentine Chamber of Deputies in the 2019 legislative election, as the second candidate in the Federal Consensus list, behind Graciela Camaño. The list received 6.01% of the votes, just enough for Camaño and Rodríguez to be elected.

As deputy, Rodríguez formed part of the parliamentary commissions on Industry, Commerce, Maritime interests, and Transport. He was an opponent of the legalization of abortion in Argentina, voting against the 2020 Voluntary Interruption of Pregnancy bill that passed the Chamber. In 2021, he was elected president of the Federal Consensus parliamentary bloc following the defection of Eduardo Bucca to the Frente de Todos bloc.

References

External links
Profile on the official website of the Chamber of Deputies (in Spanish)

Living people
1965 births
Argentine political scientists
People from Tandil
Buenos Aires Province politicians
Members of the Argentine Chamber of Deputies elected in Buenos Aires Province
Universidad del Salvador alumni
University of Chile alumni
Academic staff of the University of Buenos Aires
Academic staff of the National University of La Plata
Justicialist Party politicians
21st-century Argentine politicians